The Arizona State Sun Devils football team competes in the National Collegiate Athletic Association (NCAA) Division I Football Bowl Subdivision, representing Arizona State University.

Seasons

Notes

References

Arizona State Sun Devils

Arizona State Sun Devils football seasons